Copiapoa is a genus of flowering plants in the cactus family Cactaceae, from the dry coastal deserts, particularly the Atacama Desert, of northern Chile.

Description
It comprises 32 morphologically defined species and 5 heterotypic subspecies. The species in the genus Copiapoa forms dense cushions of hundreds of large individual plants or produce only solitary plants. The shoots are spherical or elongated-cylindrical. The spines, which are usually present, are variably shaped. On the apex, the species are usually densely woolly-haired. The ribs are clearly developed. These species vary in form from spherical to slightly columnar and in color from a brownish to blue-green body. They have warty ribs and spiny areoles, and they usually produce tubular yellow flowers which grow from woolly crowns on the apex in summer. They are bell- to funnel-shaped and open during the day. The short, circular pericarp is glabrous. The flower tube is short and broad. The small, smooth fruits contain large, shiny black seeds.

Taxonomy
Pilocopiapoa F.Ritter has been brought into synonymy with this genus. Some authorities also include here the genus Blossfeldia.

Species
Species of the genus Copiapoa according to Plants of the World Online  separated according to sections.

See also
Copiapó (the largest city of the Atacama region)
Pan de Azúcar National Park

References

External links

 From Caldera to Copiapo, a collection of images of various species
Cactuspedia Copiapoa
CactiGuide Copiapoa

Cactoideae genera
Cacti of South America
Endemic flora of Chile
Flora of northern Chile
Atacama Desert
Cactoideae